Luis Ángel Flores Pereira (born 19 September 2002) is a Bolivian footballer who plays as a defender for Nacional Potosí.

Career

Club career
Flores started playing football at Telento Export in Bolivia. He later joined Brazilian club Grêmio Novorizontino. However, he was later forced to return to Bolivia due to an injury. He ended up joining Club Bolívar after he returned home and began playing for the reserve team. Shortly after, he was also summoned to the Bolivian U-17 national team where he sat on the bench in four 2019 South American U-17 Championship games, without making his debut.

Ahead of the 2021 season, Flores became a permanent part of the first team squad. Flores made his professional debut for Club Bolívar on 13 March 2021 against Guabirá. Ahead of the 2022 season, Flores moved to fellow league club Nacional Potosí.

References

External links
 

Living people
2002 births
Association football defenders
Bolivian footballers
Bolivian expatriate footballers
Bolivian Primera División players
Club Bolívar players
Nacional Potosí players
Bolivian expatriate sportspeople in Brazil
Expatriate footballers in Brazil